Rungholt was a settlement in North Frisia, in what was then the Danish Duchy of Schleswig. The area is today located in Germany. Rungholt reportedly sank beneath the waves of the North Sea when a storm tide (known as Grote Mandrenke or Den Store Manddrukning) hit the coast on 15 or 16 January 1362.

Location
The exact location of Rungholt remains unclear. It is likely that Rungholt was situated on the island of Strand, which was overwhelmed by the Burchardi Flood of 1634, and of which the islets of Pellworm and Nordstrandischmoor and the Nordstrand peninsula are the only remaining fragments.

One possible location is west of the Hallig Südfall, where in 1921 significant ruins were discovered: wells, trenches and part of a tidal lock. Another theory places Rungholt to the north of the Hallig Südfall.

History

Today it is widely accepted that Rungholt existed and was not just a local legend. Documents support this, although they mostly date from much later times (16th century). Archaeologists think Rungholt was an important town and port. It might have contained up to 500 houses, with about 3,000 people. Findings indicate trade in agricultural products and possibly amber. Supposed relics of the town have been found in the Wadden Sea, but shifting sediments make it hard to preserve them.

There definitely was a great storm known as the Grote Mandrenke (Store Manddrukning), and sometimes also named after the saint Marcellus, on 15 or 16 January 1362. Estimates put the number of deaths at around 25,000. Possibly 30 settlements were destroyed, and the coastline shifted east, leaving formerly inhabited land in the tidal Wadden Sea.

Legends and later reception
Sometimes referred to as the "Atlantis of the North Sea", the Rungholt of legend was a large, rich town, with the catastrophe supposedly a divine punishment for the sins of its inhabitants.

Impressed by the fate of the town, the relics, and not least the legends' excessive descriptions, the German poet Detlev von Liliencron wrote the 1882 poem "Trutz, Blanke Hans" about the lost town, which begins: Heut bin ich über Rungholt gefahren, die Stadt ging unter vor sechshundert Jahren. ("Today I traveled over Rungholt; the town sank 600 years ago.").

German singer Achim Reichel put Liliencron's poem to music on his 1977 album .

German band Santiano released a song called "Rungholt" in their 2015 CD "Von Liebe, Tod und Freiheit". It also includes verses from von Liliencron's poem.

Theodor Storm mentions Rungholt in his novella Eine Halligfahrt.

Christian Kracht mentions Rungholt in his novella Faserland.

The Danish writer Dorothea Petersen  mentions Rungholt in her historical novel Havets rytter.

Ursula Hegi mentions Rungholt in her novel The Patron Saint of Pregnant Girls.(2020)

Local myth has it that one can still hear the church bells of Rungholt ringing underwater when sailing through the area on a calm night.

See also

Lost city
Dunwich
Ravenser Odd
Saeftinghe

References

External links

Submerged places
Underwater ruins
History of Schleswig-Holstein
Former populated places in Denmark
Former populated places in Germany
1362 disestablishments
Populated places disestablished in the 14th century